Cafaro is an Italian surname.

Notable people with this surname include:
 Capri Cafaro, American politician
 Debra Cafaro, American executive
 Erin Cafaro, American rower
 Lou Cafaro, Australian boxer
 Mathieu Cafaro, French footballer
 Pasquale Cafaro, Italian composer
 Paul Cafaro, better known by the stage name Blag Dahlia, American musician
 Vincent Cafaro, Italian mobster
 William M. Cafaro, American businessman

See also
 Caffaro (disambiguation)
 Cafaro Company, American retailer